George Parr may refer to:

George Parr (cricketer) (1826–1891), English cricketer
George Berham Parr (1901–1975), political figure in the USA
George Parr, a generic name for many characters in improvised dialogue by John Bird and John Fortune on TV show Bremner, Bird and Fortune